Stam1na is the self-titled debut album by Finnish thrash metal band Stam1na. It was released on March 2, 2005, and reached #13 on the official Finnish album charts.

Track listing
 "Ristiriita" (3:28) "Contradiction" or "Discrepancy". Also means a fight about (christian) cross.
 "Sananen lihasta" (3:38) "A Word About Flesh"
 "Kadonneet kolme sanaa" (3:42) "The Three Lost Words"
 "Väkivaltakunta" (3:06) "The Kingdom of Violence" (a play on words, combining "väkivalta" - violence - and "valtakunta" - kingdom)
 "Erilaisen rakkauden todistaja" (3:20) "Witness of a Different Love"
 "Koe murha!" (2:45) "Experience Murder!"
 "Tuomittu, syyllinen" (3:46) "Condemned, Guilty"
 "Peto rakasti sinua" (3:29) "The Beast Loved You"
 "Koirapoika" (3:48) "Dogboy"
 "Kaikki kääntyy vielä parhain päin" (4:08) "Everything's Going to Turn Better"
 "Paha arkkitehti" (4:00) "The Evil Architect"

Singles

 Kadonneet kolme sanaa (2005)
 Paha arkkitehti (2005)

Personnel

 Antti Hyyrynen – vocals, guitar, bass
 Pekka Olkkonen – lead guitar
 Teppo Velin – drums

Additional musicians 

 Miitri Aaltonen – backing vocals on tracks 8 and 9 
 Kaisu Kärri – female vocals on track 2

Production 

 Miitri Aaltonen – producer, engineer, mixing
 Tiina Röyskö – assistant engineer
 Mika Jussila – mastering
 Ville Hyyrynen – artwork

External links 
 Official Stam1na website
 Stam1na e-card with song samples and wallpapers
 Stam1na on the official Finnish album charts

2005 debut albums
Stam1na albums